Walter Fernando Ibáñez Costa (born December 10, 1984 in Rivera), commonly known as Walter Ibáñez, is a Uruguayan footballer who plays as a defender for Deportivo Maldonado.

External links
 Profile at BDFA
 Profile at Ceroacero
 Profile at Footballdatabase
 Profile at Soccerway

1984 births
Living people
People from Rivera Department
Uruguayan footballers
Uruguayan expatriate footballers
Centro Atlético Fénix players
Club Atlético River Plate (Montevideo) players
Defensor Sporting players
C.A. Cerro players
Club Alianza Lima footballers
Club Deportivo Universidad Católica footballers
Deportivo La Guaira players
Cienciano footballers
Rampla Juniors players
Deportivo Maldonado players
Chilean Primera División players
Peruvian Primera División players
Venezuelan Primera División players
Uruguayan Primera División players
Uruguayan Segunda División players
Uruguayan expatriate sportspeople in Chile
Uruguayan expatriate sportspeople in Peru
Uruguayan expatriate sportspeople in Venezuela
Expatriate footballers in Chile
Expatriate footballers in Peru
Expatriate footballers in Venezuela

Association football defenders